Edward Bainbridge Copnall  (29 August 1903 – 18 October 1973) was a British sculptor and painter. Best known for his architectural and decorative sculptures featuring allegorical and religious subjects. He was the President of the Royal Society of Sculptors from 1961 to 1966.

Early life and career

Edward Bainbridge Copnall was born in Cape Town, South Africa in 1903 and moved to Horsham, West Sussex in England as a young child after the death of his mother. His father, photographer Edward White Copnall (born 1878, Isle of Wight), lived and worked in Horsham from 1915 to 1962. His uncle was Liverpool-based portrait painter Frank Thomas Copnall (1870–1948). The Copnall family have a long association with Horsham, the street Copnall Way is named after them.

The exterior sculptural scheme for the Royal Institute of British Architects new building in Portland Place, London, completed in 1934, was an important early commission.

In the Second World War, he worked as a camouflage officer in the Middle East, building dummies as part of the military deception for Operation Crusader. Copnall lived in Burma from 1955 to 1956, and completed 50–60 paintings, mainly portraits, during that time. He was also commissioned to do a memorial of General Aung San, the first Prime Minister of Free Burma. The statue was unveiled in Burma in 1955.

He was president of the Royal Society of Sculptors from 1961 to 1966. Bainbridge Copnall wrote A Sculptor's Manual, published in 1971, and Cycles: An Autobiography – The Life and Work of a Sculptor, published in 2001.  His son was the artist John Copnall (1928–2007).

Notable works
 Whither, 1925. An allegorical painting depicting a funeral in a Horsham graveyard, Horsham Museum & Art Gallery.
 Percy Harris's monument in the churchyard of St Nicholas Church, Chiswick; the relief carving depicting the resurrection of the dead was carved in the late 1920s and acquired by Harris for display in his garden.  The gravestone is Grade II* listed.
 Architectural Aspiration, 1934, exterior and interior, Royal Institute of British Architects
 Sight and Sound panels, 1938, Warner Theatre, Leicester Square, London
 Wood carvings for the Cunard Line liners  and 
 St James's Theatre panels, 1959, four horizontal bas-relief panels at the site of St James's Theatre, London. Depicts the heads of Gilbert Miller, George Alexander, Oscar Wilde, and Laurence Olivier and Vivien Leigh)
 The Stag, 1962, Maidstone, Kent. His largest work, originally located in Stag Place, London but moved to Maidstone in 2004.
 Crucifixion of Jesus, 1964, St John's Church, Horsham. Made from coal dust and resin, it was removed from the facade of the church in December 2008 to Horsham Museum and Art Gallery. Rev Ewen Souter, the vicar at St John's Church called said it was "a horrifying depiction of pain and suffering" that 'scared children and deterred worshippers'.
 Thomas Becket, 1970, St Paul's Cathedral Churchyard, London
 The Boy David, 1971, Chelsea Embankment
 exterior work at St Columba's Church, Pont Street, London

Gallery

References

External links

 Copnall, Edward Bainbridge (1903–1973) Sculptor A comprehensive biography on The National Archives website-includes many photographs of Bainbridge Copnall's work.

1903 births
1973 deaths
British architectural sculptors
Members of the Order of the British Empire
Camoufleurs
20th-century British sculptors
English male sculptors
South African emigrants to the United Kingdom
People from Cape Town
People from Horsham